The Hysterangiaceae are a family of fungi in the order Hysterangiales. Species in the family are widely distributed in temperate areas and the tropics. According to a 2008 estimate, the family contains four genera and 54 species.

References

External links

Hysterangiales
Basidiomycota families